William Frederick Donnalley (born December 11, 1958) is a former American football center in the National Football League (NFL). Donnalley was selected in the third round by the Pittsburgh Steelers out of the University of North Carolina in the 1981 NFL Draft. His younger brother, Kevin Donnalley, also played in the NFL.

References

1958 births
Living people
American football centers
American football offensive guards
Kansas City Chiefs players
North Carolina Tar Heels football players
Pittsburgh Steelers players
Washington Redskins players
Players of American football from Wilmington, Delaware